Andrey Logvin (born April 4, 1964)  is a Soviet and Russian poster artist, graphic artist, designer in the sphere of graphic design and advertising.  Academician of graphic design and member of Alliance Graphique International (AGI).Owner of more than 30 awards of the International and Russian competitions of design and advertising. The winner of the State Prize of the Russian Federation in the field of literature and art for 2000.
He is presented in the directory "Who is who in Graphic Design" (300 best designers of the world). He is one of the 108 leading graphic designers in the book is "All Men are Brothers - Designer's Edition". In 2004 the Chinese Lignan Art Publishing House published the monograph "Andrey Logvin" on 165 pages.
The poster "Life Is a Success" has become a calling card of the designer.

Biography
Born in 1964, in Ipatovo village of Stavropol Region.
Graduated from Ipatovo art school.
1982–1984 – military service in the Soviet Army.
In 1987 he graduated from the Moscow Art School named in memory of 1905 (Department of Industrial Graphics), on the subject of "composition" (design) was taught by Malinkovsky.
Right after Art School he was taken for work in "Promgrafika" workshop of the Moscow Artists' Union (one of the first professional associations in this country, engaged in development of a corporate style).
In 1989–1992 he was the art director of "IMA-press" publishing house.
In 1996 he founded "LOGVINDESIGN" virtual advertising group.
Since 1999 he teaches at the Higher Academic School of Graphic Design. Member of Russian Academy of Graphic Design and Alliance Graphique International (AGI).
In 2001 was awarded the State Prize of the Russian Federation in the field of literature and art for 2000.

Teaches "communications design" at HSE Art and Design School in Moscow.

Awards
 2001 — State Prize of the Russian Federation in the field of literature and art (for a series of social, cultural and advertising posters of 1994–2000)
 1999 — "Ad Person of the Year", "Press Prize" festival, St. Petersburg

Grand prix
 2006 – Grand Prix of 17th Poster Festival in Chaumont in France for the poster "Life Is a Success" (for "Museum Night" in Krasnoyarsk Museum Center)
 1998 — Grand Prix of "Best Russian Postcards" exhibition
 1995 — Grand Prix "Red Apple" of V Moscow International Advertising Festival
 1992 — Grand Prix of I International Poster Biennale in Moscow

Awards and prizes
 2019 — First prize at the International Biennial Poster Design Terras Gauda — Francisco Mantecón Competition 2019
 2008 — Silver medal of 21st International Poster Biennale in Warsaw for the poster "Kaliningrad Branch of the National Centre for Contemporary Arts is 10"
 2006 — Diploma "Golden Bee Award" of Moscow International Biennale of Graphic Design for the poster "Taste of life"
 2005 — first prize of VI Krasnoyarsk Museum Biennale for the project "The girls are where the oil is", "Art project" nomination
 2005 — Special Jury Prize of 2nd China Biennale of Graphic Design for the poster "Stefan Sagmeister in Moscow"
 2004 — Special Prize of the City of Mons of 9th International Triennale of Political Posters, Mons, Belgium, for the poster "NUL…" (Universal declaration of human rights, Article 5. No one shall be subjected to torture or to cruel, inhuman or degrading treatment or punishment.)
 2004 — Diploma "Golden Bee Award" of Moscow International Biennale of Graphic Design for the poster "NUL…"
 1999 — Diploma "Golden Bee Award" of IV Moscow International Biennale of Graphic Design
 1999 — second prize of IX Moscow International Advertising Festival
 1998 — Diploma "Golden Bee Award" of Moscow International Biennale of Graphic Design for the poster "Hold on, Yegoriy!"
 1998 — first and second prizes of VIII Moscow International Advertising Festival
 1997 — two first prizes and Special Jury Prize of VII Moscow International Advertising Festival
 1996 — Gold medal of 15th International Poster Biennale, Warsaw, in the category of advertising posters for the poster for "LiniaGraphic" Moscow printing-house
 1996 — two third prizes of VI Moscow International Advertising Festival
 1995 — second prize of V Moscow International Advertising Festival
 1995 — third prize of All-Russian exhibition "Design’95"
 1994 — Critics award at the 16th International Biennale of design in Brno for the poster "Sasha"
 1994 — third prize of IV Moscow International Advertising Festival
 1993 — first prize of All-Russian exhibition "Design’93"

Posters

Life Is a Success
Life Is a Success is Logvin’s poster made in 1997. It is the sign poster of Russia of the 1990s era of primary accumulation of the capital. The vital motto by black caviar on a background of red caviar showed irony over optimism of a new social class – the young Russian bourgeoisie, or "New Russians". The poster snatched out the essence of the present by one gesture. This is the most well-known work of the author. The poster was published in the album The Russian Poster. 100 Masterpieces in 100 Years, and it was nominated for inclusion in the book Phaidon Graphic Classics about world icons of graphic design of all times. According to Artkhronika magazine it is one of the top 10 Russian masterpieces at the turn of the 21st century. The poster Life Is a Success is in the Tretyakov Gallery collection, and other numerous private collections.

It is sad without a label!
The poster was for the LiniaGraphic Moscow printing-house. In 1995 a symbolical poster It is sad without a label! appeared, on which the sad bottle which has a bent neck is represented. Ft first juices were "to be packed", then other food was. Today producers of food and drinks are the most frequent customers on working out packaging. Because label and packaging is effective goods promotion. In the USSR they made production, probably, not worse than western one on quality, but it had one essential shortcoming – there was no worthy packaging. It doesn't mean that there were no artists and designers in the country. There was no competition, and consequently there was no stimulus for better design of goods. 
1995 – Grand Prix "Red Apple" of V Moscow International Advertising Festival.
1996 – Gold medal of 15th International Poster Biennale, Warsaw, in the category "Advertising".
This poster can be considered as a reference point of emergence of the packaging culture in Russia.

Kaliningrad Branch of the National Centre for Contemporary Arts is 10
On November 28, 2007, Kaliningrad Branch of the National Centre for Contemporary Arts celebrated its first decade. As an anniversary symbol the organizing committee chose a piece of coal, and visualization of the idea was they ordered to LOGVINDESIGN studio. Coal still heats many houses of Kaliningrad, including KBNCCA. Therefore, starting with the date of its foundation there is a heap of coal in the yard. The history of the poster creation you can see on the studio site. Photographer Vladislav Yefimov and the trainee from Switzerland Yannick Lambiel took part in this work.
2008 – Silver medal of 21st International Poster Biennale in Warsaw in the category B (advertising of events of culture, art, education and sports). For 42 years of existence of the most authoritative world posters competition it is the seventh medal of the Russian poster artists and the second – Logvin's.

Taste of life
The poster Taste of life was created for "Museum Night" in Krasnoyarsk Museum Center took place on April 16, 2005. That time Taste of life became a subject of one of the brightest cultural events of Krasnoyarsk city. That night the Krasnoyarsk Museum Center turned into the keeper of a unique collection of tastes, sounds, smells, feelings and moods of life. Each guest of the museum was offered to feel "taste of life", all wealth and a variety of reality which surrounds us, and to reflect what "taste" is. Coffee – invigorating consciousness and the thoughts, aggravating the imagination, one of the most democratic drinks, uniting practically all countries of the world and people of the most different age became a peculiar keynote of reflections over life, communication, creativity. Visitors could make fascinating travel on the various thematic platforms of the museum filled with a certain atmosphere of culture and a life of the countries of Europe, Asia, Australia, the cultures possessing bright and peculiar tastes of life, music, creativity, policy, history, time – unique "life kitchen".
VI "Museum Night" in Krasnoyarsk Museum Center
Therefore, in the center of the poster the cup of coffee is placed. Photographer: Vladislav Yefimov.
The poster won Grand Prix of 17th Poster Festival in Chaumont in France for the poster  and "Golden Bee Award" Diploma of Moscow International Biennale of Graphic Design.

NUL…
NUL… (Nobody…) was created by request of the Ministry of National Education, France. The poster illustrates the Article 5 of the Declaration of human rights. 70,000 copies were printed.
Article 5.
No one shall be subjected to torture or to cruel, inhuman or degrading treatment or punishment.
Universal declaration of human rights
In 2004 the poster won Special Prize of the City of Mons of 9th International Triennale of Political Posters, Mons, Belgium, and "Golden Bee Award" Diploma of Moscow International Biennale of Graphic Design.

Teaching activity
Logvin teaches at the Higher Academic school of graphic design. He gave lectures and master-classes in Switzerland, Turkey, France, Ukraine, China, Mexico.
Logvin set such wild study speed, that it was impossible to stay not active. Tasks replaced one another with an interval of 15 minutes – 5 minutes work, 15 minutes discussion, 5 minutes work, 15 minutes discussion, and all three hours that way. The course fully justifies the name of "intensive".
From "Summer school" Logbook (the educational project of the Higher Academic School of Graphic Design), 2002

Author's posters are in collections of
  State Tretyakov Gallery, Moscow;
  Russian State Library, formerly Lenin Library, Moscow;
  State Russian Museum, St. Petersburg;
  Poster Museum at Wilanów, Warsaw, Poland;
  Moravian Gallery in Brno, Czech Republic;
  The International Poster Collection, Colorado State University;
  Museum of Modern Art, Toyama, Japan;
  Ogaki Poster Museum, Japan;
  Lahti Art Museum, Finland;
  New Art Museum, Munich, Germany;
  M'ARS Gallery collection, Moscow.

Personal exhibitions and actions
 2022 – "Three Main Words" at the "SlovoNovo" forum in Montenegro, Budva;
 2021 – The first painting exhibition at the Zverev Centre of Contemporary Art, Moscow, Russia;
 2010 – personal exhibition in Avla Gallery, Slovenia;
 2008 – personal exhibition in Gutenberg Museum, Fribourg, Switzerland;
 2005 – (jointly with V. Chayka and Y. Surkov), Paris;
 2003 – «Return of the Amber Room». Art-Moscow, CHA, Moscow;
 2002 – "Logvin, Peret, Plyuta, Tartakover". Poster Museum at Wilanów;
 2001 – "K. Kujasalo, J. Lin, A. Logvin, R. Tissi", Lahti Art Museum, Finland;
 2001 – "Grafist 5". MSU Tophane-i Amire Cultural Center Art Gallery, Istanbul, Turkey;
 2000 – "Graphistes autor du monde", Eshiroles, France;
 2000 – "…NO, ME!", XL Gallery, Moscow;
 1998 – "U.G. Sato, Koji Mizutani, Andrey Logvin". Poster Museum at Wilanów;
 1998 – "The End", XL Gallery, Moscow;
 1998 – "Triplet. Kitayeva. Logvin. Chayka". (jointly with V. Chayka and E. Kitayeva). DNP Duo Dojima Gallery, Osaka, Japan;
 1997 – "Life Is a Success!", performance. Central House of Artists, Moscow;
 1995 – "Stake on green!", cockroach races, devoted to presidential elections. M. Guelman Gallery, Moscow;
 1995 – "Happy birthday, Death!" (jointly with Y. Shabelnikov). The action devoted to the 50th anniversary of nuclear bombing of Hiroshima. M. Guelman Gallery, Moscow;
 1994 – "Zenbook". Studio 20 Gallery, Moscow;
 1994 – "Andrey Tykvin. The Logvins". Punkt Gallery, CHA, Moscow.

References

External links
 Andrew logvin's facebook
 
 Andrew logvin's Master Class at the exhibition "Creative Future 2009"

Living people
Russian designers
State Prize of the Russian Federation laureates
Russian poster artists
1964 births
Academic staff of the Higher School of Economics